Mouna Benabderrassoul  (born May 12, 1984) is a Moroccan taekwondo athlete. She won the bronze medal in lightweight (-63 kg) at the 2001 World Taekwondo Championships in Jeju City, South Korea.
 
Benabderrassoul represented her country in the -67 kg class at the 2008 Beijing Olympics.

References
Mouna Benabderrassoul's profile at ESPN Sports

1984 births
Living people
Moroccan female taekwondo practitioners
Taekwondo practitioners at the 2004 Summer Olympics
Taekwondo practitioners at the 2008 Summer Olympics
Olympic taekwondo practitioners of Morocco
World Taekwondo Championships medalists
20th-century Moroccan women
21st-century Moroccan women